was a Japanese samurai lord during the Heian period. He served as Governor of Kai Province. He is credited as the ancient progenitor of the Japanese martial art, Daitō-ryū aiki-jūjutsu and Takeda-ryū.

Biography 
Yoshimitsu was born the son of Chinjufu-shōgun Minamoto no Yoriyoshi (988-1075) of the Minamoto clan. His brother was the Minamoto no Yoshiie. He was also known as Shinra Saburō (新羅 三郎), a nickname that comes from the Shinra Zenjindo Hall of Mii-dera Temple, where he had his coming-of-age ceremony. His Dharma name was Senkōin Shuntoku Sonryō (先甲院峻徳尊了).

According to Daitō-ryū's initial history, Yoshimitsu dissected the corpses of men killed in battle, and studied them for the purpose of learning vital point striking (kyusho-jitsu) and joint lock techniques. Daitō-ryū takes its name from that of a mansion that Yoshimitsu lived in as a child, called "Daitō", in Ōmi Province (modern-day Shiga Prefecture).

For military service during the Later Three-Year War (1083–1089), Yoshimitsu was made Governor of Kai Province (modern-day Yamanashi Prefecture), where he settled.

Yoshimitsu's son, Minamoto no Yoshikiyo, took the surname "Takeda" and is also known as Takeda Yoshikiyo, and the techniques Yoshimitsu discovered would be secretly passed down within the Takeda clan until the late 19th century, when Takeda Sokaku (Daitō-ryū) and Oba Ichio (Takeda-ryū) have started to teach them to the public.

Family
 Father: Chinjufu-shōgun Minamoto no Yoriyoshi
 Mother: daughter of Taira no Naokata
 Wife: daughter of Taira no Kiyomoto, of the Hitachi Heishi (Taira) branch
 Children:
 Minamoto no Yoshinori (Satake)
 Minamoto no Yoshikiyo (Takeda)
 Minamoto no Moriyoshi (Hiraga)
 Minamoto no Chikayoshi (Okada)

References

 Daito-Ryu Aiki Budo

Samurai
People of Heian-period Japan
1045 births
1127 deaths
Minamoto clan
Deified Japanese people
Heian period Buddhists